Otter Lake is a 765-acre (3.0 km²) reservoir in Macoupin County, Illinois.  It is located 6 miles (10 km) west of Girard.  The reservoir is named after Otter Creek, a tributary of Macoupin Creek and the Illinois River.

Otter Creek was dammed to provide flood control, water-based recreation, and a source of clean water for North Otter and South Otter Townships within Macoupin County.  Recreation centers on fishing opportunities, with the lake managed for striped bass, crappie, and muskie.

There is a strictly-enforced power limit on the lake, with motors banned if stronger than 115 horsepower.  The lake is troubled by sedimentation, with riprap applied to many patches of shoreline to reduce (but not eliminate) erosion of silt into the lake.  Historically, quantities of atrazine have entered the lake from nearby farm fields to which the chemical is applied.

References

External links
 Illinois Natural History Survey
 Otter Lake Fishing
 

Reservoirs in Illinois
Protected areas of Macoupin County, Illinois
Bodies of water of Macoupin County, Illinois